Syracuse Township is a township in Hamilton County, Kansas, USA.  As of the 2000 census, its population was 2,165.

Geography
According to the USGS, it contains one cemetery, Syracuse.

The streams of Sand Creek and Syracuse Creek run through this township.

Transportation
Syracuse Township contains one airport or landing strip, Syracuse-Hamilton County Municipal Airport.

References
 USGS Geographic Names Information System (GNIS)

External links
 US-Counties.com
 City-Data.com

Townships in Hamilton County, Kansas
Townships in Kansas